Adrià Giner Pedrosa (born 13 May 1998) is a Spanish professional footballer who plays for RCD Espanyol as a left back.

Club career
Born in Barcelona, Catalonia, Pedrosa joined RCD Espanyol's youth setup in 2014, from EF Gavà. He made his senior debut with the reserves on 16 April 2017, starting in a 1–1 Segunda División B away draw against RCD Mallorca B.

Pedrosa was definitely promoted to the B-team in July 2017, after the club's relegation, and scored his first senior goal on 10 September of that year, netting his side's second in a 3–2 home success over UE Sant Andreu. He made his first-team debut on 1 November 2018, starting in a 1–2 away loss against Cádiz CF, for the season's Copa del Rey.

Pedrosa made his La Liga debut on 16 December 2018, playing the full 90 minutes in a 1–3 home loss against Real Betis. He scored his first goal in the category the following 13 April, netting the opener in a 2–1 home success over Deportivo Alavés.

On 22 May 2019, Pedrosa signed a new contract with the Pericos until 2023, being definitely promoted to the main squad.

References

External links

Profile at the RCD Espanyol website

1998 births
Living people
Footballers from Barcelona
Spanish footballers
Association football defenders
La Liga players
Segunda División B players
Tercera División players
RCD Espanyol B footballers
RCD Espanyol footballers
Spain under-21 international footballers